Juan Francisco Bulnes is a municipality in the Honduran department of Gracias a Dios.

The total population of the municipality was 6,407 in 2015. 
The rivers Abajo and Platano along with the lagoon of Ibans form the major water systems of the municipality. Almost all the localities are located next to these water systems with Ibans being the biggest. The only health centre of the municipality is located in Ibans.

Demographics
At the time of the 2013 Honduras census, Juan Francisco Bulnes municipality had a population of 6,392. Of these, 44.53% were Mestizo, 44.36% Indigenous (43.04% Miskito), 10.59% Afro-Honduran or Black, 0.33% White and 0.20% others.

References

Municipalities of the Gracias a Dios Department